Players born on or after 1 January 1987 were eligible to participate in the tournament. Players' age as of 18 July 2006 – the tournament's opening day. Players in bold have later been capped at full international level.

Group A

Head coach:  Paul Gludovatz

Head coach:  Marc Van Geersom

Head coach:  Miroslav Soukup

Head coach:  Michał Globisz

Group B

Head coach: Carlos Dinis

Head coach:  Archie Gemmill

Head coach:  Ginés Meléndez

Head coach:  Cem Pamiroğlu

Footnotes

Squads
UEFA European Under-19 Championship squads